Hugo Alberto Sofovich (December 18, 1939 – January 12, 2003) was an Argentine film director and screenwriter.

Although predominantly a screenwriter, Sofovich directed 15 films and script write over 20 films during his career, directed and writing films such as Amante para dos in 1988. In the late 1990s he write several scripts for Argentine television.

He died in 2003 from pancreatic cancer. He was the brother of Gerardo Sofovich.

Selected filmography
The Inheritance of Uncle Pepe (1998) 
El manosanta está cargado (1987)
El telo y la tele (1985)
Un terceto peculiar (1982)
Amante para dos (1981)
Las mujeres son cosa de guapos (1981)
Te rompo el rating (1981)
Luz - Cama - Accion (1981)
Departamento compartido (1980)
A los cirujanos se les va la mano (1980)
Así no hay cama que aguante (1980)
El rey de los exhortos (1979)
Expertos en Pinchazos (1979)
Custodio de señoras (1979)
Un toque diferente (1977)
La Noche del hurto (1976)

External links
 
 

1939 births
2003 deaths
Deaths from pancreatic cancer
Argentine film directors
Male screenwriters
Deaths from cancer in Argentina
20th-century Argentine screenwriters
20th-century Argentine male writers
Argentine Jews
Argentine people of Russian-Jewish descent